Littorina Sea (also Litorina Sea) is a geological brackish water stage of the Baltic Sea, which existed around 7500–4000 BP and followed the Mastogloia Sea, a transitional stage of the Ancylus Lake. 

This stage and form of the body of water is named after common periwinkle (Littorina littorea), then a prevailing mollusc in the waters, which indicates its salinity.

A transgression of the Baltic approximately 4500 BP widened its ocean link, allowing it to reach a peak of salinity during the warmer Atlantic period of European climatology. At this peak, the sea bore twice the volume of water and covered 26.5% more land than it does today. As the period ended, the features of the modern coast appeared, including lagoons, spits, and dunes. Notable exceptions include steep terraces such as the Øresund where the recession of sea level exposes less dry land.

During the period, temperate deciduous forest crept north to cover the littoral hinterland.

Bibliography
 

History of the Baltic Sea
Holocene
7th millennium BC
6th millennium BC
5th millennium BC
8th millennium BC